WEOW (92.7 FM) is a commercial radio station broadcasting a Top 40 (CHR) format branded as "WEOW 92.7" (pronounced as "wow"). The station is currently owned by Robert Holladay, through licensee Florida Keys Media, LLC, and is the southernmost Top 40 (CHR) station in the continental United States. Its 100,000 watt signal covers an area from Key Largo, Florida, to Havana, Cuba. Despite its logo’s font and style being almost identical to the one used by iHeartMedia for its KISS-FM branded stations (and other stations owned by the company), the station has no connection to them.

History

Early history
Originally WFYN-FM, this was the Florida Keys' first FM radio station when Gayle Swofford's Florida Keys Broadcasting Corporation began airing on February 20, 1967 at 92.5 FM with a Beautiful Music format. In 1982 the format was updated to Adult Contemporary and in the mid-80s the call sign was changed to WEOW and the station became known as "WOW 92.5".

WEOW 92.5/92.7
In 1990, WEOW dropped its Adult Contemporary format for Top 40 (CHR) but retained the "Wow 92.5" branding. During this time, the station featured popular personalities such as Paul Joffe, Chris Wolfe & JR in the Morning and Bill Bravo, who remains to this day. 

In the early 2000s, Clear Channel Communications purchased WEOW and ended up moving the station up the dial to 92.7.

On January 25, 2008, it was announced that WEOW was one of several Clear Channel radio stations to be sold, in order to remain under the ownership caps following the sale of Clear Channel to private investors. The station, along with its sister stations, was put into the Aloha Stations Trust until November 2013 when they were purchased by newly formed Florida Keys Media. The sale was finalized on February 28, 2014 at a price of $650,000, and WEOW began restructuring its on-air lineup, dropping all of Clear Channel's Premium Choice jocks for live and local talent. WEOW continues to be "powered by iHeartRadio" even after Clear Channel sold the station.

On April 1, 2014, WEOW brought back station vets Rude Girl & Molly Blue for mornings.

On-air lineup
The current lineup (As of July 7, 2014) is as follows

Morning Show (6am-10am): Rude Girl & Molly Blue - Rudey "Rude Girl" Gee & Molly Blue  
Mid-Days (10am-2pm): Courtney Cruise
Afternoon Drive (2pm-7pm): Bill Bravo
Nights (8pm-10pm): Rudey's back
Nights (10pm-12am): Courtney Cruise

External links
WEOW 92-7
Keys Radio

Contemporary hit radio stations in the United States
EOW
1967 establishments in Florida
Radio stations established in 1967